The Epsilon oil field is an oil field located in north Aegean Sea. It was discovered in 2000 and developed by Energean Oil & Gas. It began production in 2010 and produces oil.

See also

 Energy in Greece

References

Oil fields in Greece